Barak Badash is an Israeli former footballer who played as a striker. He is of a Tunisian-Jewish descent.

Career
Badash began his senior career with the semi-professional team of Maccabi Hadera, from there he transferred to Maccabi Ramat-Amidar, there he played one year and transferred to Hapoel Tel Aviv. Badash played 14 matches with Hapoel and scored two goals. At the end of the season, he was transferred to Bnei Yehuda Tel Aviv, where he played for two years.

In the summer of 2007, he transferred to Hakoah Amidar Ramat-Gan, where he scored 18 goals in 58 appearances. After two years with the club, he transferred to Ashdod and in the middle of the season to Hapoel bear-Sheva, where he scored 7 goals in 13 matches.

On 5 July 2010, he signed with Hapoel Ironi Kiryat Shmona, where he won the Toto Cup in his first season with the club. In the next season, he won the Israeli Championship with Kiryat Shmona, the club's first title. On 30 August 2012, he played on loan in Belgium for Waasland-Beveren. After one season, he returned to Kiryat Shmona.

On 30 January 2014, he moved to Maccabi Tel Aviv after Maccabi paid a $150,000 transfer fee to Kiryat Shmona.

In the 2015–16 season, Badash played for Hapoel Ra'anana.

After 13 years since he left the youth ranks of Maccabi Netanya, Badash returned to his home club and made his senior debut for Netanya on 12 September 2016.

Personal life
On 17 May 2009, Badash married girlfriend Sharon in a Jewish ceremony at Trask, a wedding hall in the Tel Aviv Port area. He is also known by his uncanny resemblance to Swedish international footballer Zlatan Ibrahimović.

Honours
Israeli Championships (2)
2011–12, 2013–14, 2014–15
Israel State Cup (1)
2014–15
Toto Cup (3)
2010–11, 2011–12, 2014–15
Liga Leumit (2)
2007-08, 2016-17

Footnotes

External links
 Profile and statistics of Barak Badash on One.co.il
 

1982 births
Living people
Israeli Mizrahi Jews
Israeli footballers
Maccabi Netanya F.C. players
Maccabi Ramat Amidar F.C. players
Hapoel Tel Aviv F.C. players
Bnei Yehuda Tel Aviv F.C. players
Hakoah Maccabi Amidar Ramat Gan F.C. players
F.C. Ashdod players
Hapoel Be'er Sheva F.C. players
Hapoel Ironi Kiryat Shmona F.C. players
S.K. Beveren players
Maccabi Tel Aviv F.C. players
Hapoel Ra'anana A.F.C. players
Israeli expatriate footballers
Expatriate footballers in Belgium
Israeli expatriate sportspeople  in Belgium
Liga Leumit players
Israeli Premier League players
Footballers from Netanya
Israeli people of Tunisian-Jewish descent
Association football forwards